Pentre Dwr (or Pentre-dŵr) is a village in the City and County of Swansea, Wales within the Bon-y-maen ward.  The village approximates to the settlement east of Winch Wen and south of Trallwn along Crymlyn Road.

Pentre Dwr is Welsh for Water Village.

Villages in Swansea